Joseph Hautman (born July 10, 1956) is an American painter, residing in Plymouth, Minnesota. The artist is best known for his realism wildlife art, particularly the US Federal Duck Stamp.  The artist holds a Ph.D. in Physics from the University of Michigan and has had his artwork featured on the 2016, 2012, 2008, 2002, and 1992 Federal Duck Stamps, raising millions for conservation.

His brothers Robert Hautman and Jim Hautman are also award-winning wildlife artists.

See also
 Bonnie, Rebecca and Karen Latham

References

External links
 Official website

Living people
20th-century American painters
American male painters
21st-century American painters
21st-century American male artists
People from Plymouth, Minnesota
Painters from Minnesota
American bird artists
University of Michigan alumni
1956 births
20th-century American male artists